The Sartang (Sartaŋ) is a river in the Republic of Sakha in Russia.

Course 
From this area, the Sartang heads north along the Barylas, and continues north along the Yana Plateau between the Verkhoyansk Range to the west and the Chersky Range to the east.

The area around the Sartang consists of taiga.

See also
List of rivers of Russia
Yana-Oymyakon Highlands§Hydrography

References

Rivers of the Sakha Republic
Verkhoyansk Range